Banca di Credito Cooperativo di Roma is an Italian cooperative bank based in Rome, Lazio region. The bank is a member of Federazione Italiana delle Banche di Credito Cooperativo - Casse Rurali ed Artigiane (Federcasse) and Federazione delle Banche di Credito Cooperativo del Lazio Umbria Sardegna (27.98% stake). The bank is a minority shareholders of ICCREA Holding (3.60%).

The bank originated as a rural credit union. The bank was supervised by the board of directors, (supervisory board) which also appointed 5 directors as managing directors (managing board). The chairman of board of directors was Francesco Liberati, the general manager of the bank in 1980s.

In 2014 the bank acquired Banca della Tuscia Credito Cooperativo.

On 18 December 2015 the bank acquired Banca Padovana Credito Cooperativo which was under special administration by Banca d'Italia (decree by Ministry of Economy and Finance).

In 2015 the bank also acquired a minority stake in the share capital of Banca d'Italia.

In 2016 the bank acquired Banca di Capranica Credito Cooperativo.

The bank was affected by Decree-Law N°18/2016 (Law N°49/2016), which requires cooperative credit union (BCC) to form a holding company .

See also

 Banca di Roma
 
 
 Banca Popolare del Lazio

References

External links
  

Cooperative banks of Italy
Companies based in Rome
Banks established in 1954
Italian companies established in 1954
Fiumicino